Francesco Maria Febei (1616 – 29 November 1680) was a Roman Catholic prelate who served as Titular Archbishop of Tarsus (1667–1680).

Biography
Francesco Maria Febei was born in Orvietto, Italy in 1616. On 18 April 1667, he was appointed during the papacy of Pope Alexander VII as Titular Archbishop of Tarsus. He served as Titular Archbishop of Tarsus until his death on 29 November 1680.

Episcopal succession

References 

17th-century Italian Roman Catholic titular archbishops
Bishops appointed by Pope Alexander VII
1616 births
1680 deaths